The Ritual is a 2009 pseudo-documentary (cinéma vérité) horror film written and directed by Anthony Spadaccini. The film is a sequel to Spadaccini's 2007 horror film Head Case and continues the story of Claymont, Delaware serial killer Wayne Montgomery, who films his crimes. The plot details the beginning of Wayne's vaunting task of grooming a successor, until outside influences threaten to destroy their sadistic relationship.

Cast 
 Paul McCloskey as Wayne Montgomery
 Barbara Lessin as Andrea Montgomery
 Brinke Stevens as Julie
 Joey Garrison as Jared
 Devin Kates as Seth
 Michael J. Panichelli, Jr. as Detective John Haynes
 Mark Cray as John Craven

References

External links 
 

2009 films
American horror films
Found footage films
2009 horror films
2000s English-language films
2000s American films